Michael Woodward may refer to:

 Michael Woodward, British priest tortured aboard the Chilean naval vessel Esmeralda
 Michael Woodward (academic) (1602–1675), English educational administrator